Bathurst Island Airport  is an airport located at Wurrumiyanga, on the southeast coast of Bathurst Island, in the Northern Territory of Australia.

However, there are regular, smaller commercial tours to the island.

History
The Royal Australian Air Force utilised the airfield during World War II. The original airfield is now the public cemetery with the newer strip located 2 kilometres west.

Airlines and destinations

See also
List of airports in the Northern Territory

References

External links
 

Airports in the Northern Territory
Former Royal Australian Air Force bases